Tony Ford nicknamed "Boots" is an Australian former rugby league footballer who played in the 1960s and 1970s. He played for the Western Suburbs in the New South Wales Rugby League (NSWRL) competition.

Background
Ford grew up in Homebush and Strathfield before signing with Western Suburbs.  Ford played in the Presidents Cup and Jersey Flegg Cup Western Suburbs sides.

Playing career
Ford made his first grade debut for Western Suburbs against Parramatta in 1967 at Cumberland Oval.  Ford played with Western Suburbs for eight seasons and finished as the club's top point scorer in 4 of those seasons.  Ford's time at Western Suburbs was not very successful with the club finishing last in 1971.  In his final season at Wests, the club reached the preliminary final against eventual premiers Eastern Suburbs at the Sydney Cricket Ground but lost the match 25-2.

After leaving Wests, Ford became captain-coach of Tumut and then spent one final year as a player with Wentworthville in the Sydney metropolitan competition.

References

1946 births
Living people
Date of birth missing (living people)
Australian rugby league players
Western Suburbs Magpies players
Wentworthville Magpies players
Rugby league fullbacks
Rugby league players from Sydney